The Women's pentathlon 4 was a pentathlon event held in athletics at the 1972 Summer Paralympics in Heidelberg.

Five athletes competed, representing four nations. As the only athlete to score more than 4000 points, Germany's Marga Floer took the gold medal.

References 

Pentathlon